Michael Coyle (born 5 August 1948) is a Social Democratic and Labour Party (SDLP) politician  in Northern Ireland, who was a  Member of the Northern Ireland Assembly (MLA) for  East Londonderry from 2002 to 2003.

Born in Dungiven, Coyle attended St Columb's College in Derry and the Belfast College of Technology.  He worked as a telephone engineer for British Telecom and in 1993 was co-opted on to Limavady Borough Council as a Social Democratic and Labour Party (SDLP) representative.

In 1996 he was an unsuccessful candidate in the Northern Ireland Forum election in East Londonderry. Following the resignation of Northern Ireland Assembly member Arthur Doherty on 1 September 2002, Coyle was co-opted on to the body, representing East Londonderry.  He stood in the constituency in the 2003 Assembly election, but was not elected.

References

1948 births
Living people
Northern Ireland MLAs 1998–2003
Social Democratic and Labour Party MLAs
People from Dungiven
Members of Limavady Borough Council
British Telecom people